is a town located in Nagano Prefecture, Japan. , the town had an estimated population of 14,485 in 5958 households, and a population density of 102 persons per km².

Geography
Fujimi is located in a very mountainous area within the Suwa region of east-central Nagano, and includes the Akaishi Mountains, including Mount Nyukasa (1955 meters) partly within its borders. The town has an average altitude of 977 meters

Climate
The town has a climate characterized by characterized by hot and humid summers, and relatively mild winters (Köppen climate classification Cfa).  The average annual temperature in Fujimi is 9.6 °C. The average annual rainfall is 1411 mm with September as the wettest month. The temperatures are highest on average in August, at around 22.3 °C, and lowest in January, at around -2.7 °C.

Surrounding municipalities
Nagano Prefecture
 Chino
 Ina
 Hara
Yamanashi Prefecture
Hokuto

Demographics
Per Japanese census data, the population of Fujimi has remained relatively steady over the past 40 years.

History
The area of present-day Fujimi was part of ancient Shinano Province. Fujimi Village was established on April 1, 1889 with the establishment of the modern municipalities system. On April 1, 1995 Fujimi merged with the villages of Sakai, Hongo, and Ochiai to form the town of Fujimi.

Education
Fujimi has three public elementary schools and one public middle school operated by the town government, and one public high school operated by the Nagano Prefectural Board of Education. The town also has one public special education school operated by the prefectural government

Transportation

Railway
 East Japan Railway Company - Chūō Main Line
  -  -

Highway
  Chūō Expressway

International relations
 – Richmond, New Zealand

Local attractions
Idojiri ruins, a Jōmon-period archaeological site and National Historic Site with on-site museum.

In popular culture
The town is featured in the Forza Motorsport series as the track Fujimi Kaido.

References

External links
 
Official Website 

 
Towns in Nagano Prefecture